Moyna (referred to as Dakshin Moyna in census records) is a village in Moyna CD block in Tamluk subdivision of Purba Medinipur district in the state of West Bengal, India.

History
According to Binoy Ghosh, the ancient or even the medieval history of Moyna or Moynagarh is mired in controversy and uncertainties. Some enthusiasts of local history believe that Moyna was the birth-place and capital of Lau Sen. The question that comes up in this regard is that Lau Sen's existence is yet to be established historically. He remains a mythical king. Similarly, there are various complications about the origin of the name. Setting aside these controversies, we can take up certain points from comparatively more recent history. Let us focus on the 15th century during Muslim rule. Gobardhanananda Samanta was the founder of the Moyna raj family. He was a sixth generation descendant of Kalindiram Samanta, who was a general of the Utkal kings. During his rule there was a dacoit named Sri Dhar, who had a Robin Hood imge. The Utkal king could not collect any rent from Sri Dhar, and Gobardhanananda Samanta also failed to pay his rent on time. He was imprisoned by the Utkal king but Gobardhanananda Samanta's passion for music charmed him and he was released with due honours. He ultimately succeeded in eliminating Sri Dhar.

Geography

Physical geography
The Keleghai flows on the south of Moyna. On the north flows the Kasai, Baksui and Panchtui. In the olden days, many of these rivers joined and flew into the sea, which was not very far off from the port city of Tamluk. Sabang is in the west and Tamluk is on the east. The area had come up from the sea and was called ‘Moynachar’. During the rule of the Utkal Raj, it was called a ‘chaura’ or island-like area.

Police station
Moyna police station has jurisdiction over Moyna CD block. Moyna police station covers an area of 147 km2 with a population of 196,903. It is located in Anandapur Mouza.

CD block HQ
The headquarters of this CD block are located at Dakshin Moyna.

Urbanisation
94.08% of the population of Tamluk subdivision live in the rural areas. Only 5.92% of the population live in the urban areas, and that is the second lowest proportion of urban population amongst the four subdivisions in Purba Medinipur district, just above Egra subdivision.

Note: The map alongside presents some of the notable locations in the subdivision. All places marked in the map are linked in the larger full screen map.

Demographics
As per 2011 Census of India Dakshin Moyna had a total population of 3,695 of which 1,971 (53%) were males and 1,724 (47%) were females. Population below 6 years was 319. The total number of literates in Dakshin Moyna was 3,062 (90.70% of the population over 6 years).

Healthcare
Gar Moyna Block Primary Health Centre, PO Moyna (with 15 beds) is the main medical facility in Moyna CD block. There are primary health centres at Ramchandrapur (with 2 beds) and Arangkianara (with 10 beds).

Moyna picture gallery

Moynagarh Island

Lokeswara Shiva temple

References

External links

Villages in Purba Medinipur district